Sir Thomas Lawrence  (13 April 1769 – 7 January 1830) was an English portrait painter and the fourth president of the Royal Academy. A child prodigy, he was born in Bristol and began drawing in Devizes, where his father was an innkeeper at the Bear Hotel in the Market Square. At age ten, having moved to Bath, he was supporting his family with his pastel portraits. At 18, he went to London and soon established his reputation as a portrait painter in oils, receiving his first royal commission, a portrait of Queen Charlotte, in 1790. He stayed at the top of his profession until his death, aged 60, in 1830.

Self-taught, he was a brilliant draughtsman and known for his gift of capturing a likeness, as well as his virtuoso handling of paint. He became an associate of the Royal Academy in 1791, a full member in 1794, and president in 1820. 

In 1810, he acquired the generous patronage of the Prince Regent, was sent abroad to paint portraits of allied leaders for the Waterloo chamber at Windsor Castle, and is particularly remembered as the Romantic portraitist of the Regency. 

Lawrence's love affairs were not happy (his tortuous relationships with Sally and Maria Siddons were the subjects of several books) and, in spite of his success, he spent most of life deep in debt. He never married. At his death, he was the most fashionable portrait painter in Europe. His reputation waned during Victorian times, but has since been partially restored.

Biography

Childhood and early career 
Lawrence was born at 6 Redcross Street, Bristol, the youngest surviving child of Thomas Lawrence, a supervisor of excise, and Lucy Read, a clergyman's daughter. They had 16 children, but only five survived infancy: Lawrence's brother Andrew became a clergyman; William had a career in the army; and sisters Lucy and Anne married a solicitor and a clergyman (Lawrence's nephews included Andrew Bloxam). Soon after Thomas was born, his father decided to become an innkeeper and took over the White Lion Inn and next-door American Coffee House in Broad Street, Bristol. But the venture did not prosper, and in 1773 Lawrence senior removed his family from Bristol and took over the tenancy of the Black Bear Inn in Devizes, a favourite stopping place for the London gentry making their annual trip to take the waters at Bath.

It was during the family's six-year stay at the Black Bear Inn that Lawrence senior began to make use of his son's precocious talents for drawing and reciting poetry. Visitors would be greeted with the words "Gentlemen, here's my son—will you have him recite from the poets, or take your portraits?" Among those who listened to a recitation from Tom, or Tommy as he was called, was actor David Garrick. 

Lawrence's formal schooling was limited to two years at The Fort, a school in Bristol, when he was six to eight; and a little tuition in French and Latin from a dissenting minister. He also became accomplished in dancing, fencing, boxing and billiards. By age ten his fame had spread sufficiently for him to receive a mention in Daines Barrington's Miscellanies as "without the most distant instruction from anyone, capable of copying historical pictures in a masterly style". But once again Lawrence senior failed as a landlord; in 1779, he was declared bankrupt and the family moved to Bath. From this point on, Lawrence supported his parents with his portrait work.

The family settled at 2 Alfred Street in Bath, and the young Lawrence established himself as a portraitist in pastels. His oval portraits, for which he was soon charging three guineas, were about 12 inches by 10 inches (30 by 25 centimetres), and usually portrayed a half-length. His sitters included the Duchess of Devonshire, Sarah Siddons, Sir Henry Harpur (of Calke Abbey, Derbyshire, who offered to send Lawrence to Italy, but Lawrence senior refused to part with his son), Warren Hastings, and Sir Elijah Impey. Talented, charming and attractive (and surprisingly modest) Lawrence was popular with Bath residents and visitors. Artists William Hoare and Mary Hartley gave him encouragement. Wealthy people allowed him to study their collections of paintings, and Lawrence's drawing of a copy of Raphael's Transfiguration was awarded a silver-gilt palette and a prize of 5 guineas by the Society of Arts in London.

"Always in love and always in debt" 

Sometime before his eighteenth birthday in 1787 Lawrence arrived in London, taking lodgings in Leicester Square, near to Joshua Reynolds' studio. He was introduced to Reynolds, who advised him to study nature rather than the Old Masters. Lawrence set up a studio at 41 Jermyn Street and installed his parents in a house in Greek Street. He exhibited several works in the 1787 Royal Academy exhibition at Somerset House, and enrolled as a student at the Royal Academy but did not stay long, abandoning the drawing of classical statues to concentrate on his portraiture. 

At the Royal Academy exhibition of 1788 he was represented by five portraits in pastels and one in oils, a medium he quickly mastered. Between 1787 and his death in 1830 he missed only two of the annual exhibitions: in 1809, protesting how his paintings had been displayed; and in 1819, because he was abroad. In 1789 he exhibited 13 portraits, mostly in oil, including one of William Linley and one of Lady Cremorne, his first attempt at a full-length portrait. They received favourable comments in the press, with one critic referring to him as "the Sir Joshua of futurity not far off". Aged just 20, Lawrence received his first royal commission, a summons arriving from Windsor Palace to paint the portraits of Queen Charlotte and Princess Amelia. 

The queen found Lawrence presumptuous (although he made a good impression on the princesses and ladies-in-waiting) and she did not like the finished portrait, which remained in Lawrence's studio until his death. When it was exhibited at the Royal Academy in 1790, however, it received critical acclaim. Also shown that year was another of Lawrence's most famous portraits, that of actress Elizabeth Farren, soon to be the Countess of Derby, "completely Elizabeth Farren: arch, spirited, elegant and engaging", according to one newspaper.

In 1791 Lawrence was elected an associate of the Royal Academy and the following year, on the death of Sir Joshua Reynolds, King George III appointed him "painter-in-ordinary to his majesty". His reputation was established, and he moved to a studio in Old Bond Street. In 1794 he became a full member of the Royal Academy. 

Although commissions were pouring in, Lawrence was in financial difficulties. His debts stayed with him for the rest of life. He narrowly avoided bankruptcy, had to be bailed out by wealthy sitters and friends, and died insolvent. Biographers have never been able to discover the source of his debts; he was a prodigiously hard worker (once referring in a letter to his portrait painting as "mill-horse business") and did not appear to live extravagantly. Lawrence himself said: "I have never been extravagant nor profligate in the use of money. Neither gaming, horses, curricles, expensive entertainments, nor secret sources of ruin from vulgar licentiousness have swept it from me". This has generally been accepted, with biographers blaming his financial problems on his generosity towards his family and others, his inability to keep accounts (in spite of advice from his friend, painter and diarist Joseph Farington), and his magnificent but costly collection of Old Master drawings.

Another source of unhappiness in Lawrence's life was his romantic entanglement with two of Sarah Siddons' daughters. He fell in love first with Sally, then transferred his affections to her sister Maria, then broke with Maria and turned to Sally again. Both sisters had fragile health; Maria died in 1798, on her deathbed extracting a promise from her sister never to marry Lawrence. Sally kept her promise and refused to see Lawrence again; she died in 1803. Lawrence continued on friendly terms with their mother and painted several portraits of her. He never married. In later years, two women provided him with companionship — friends Elizabeth Croft, and Isabella Wolff, who met Lawrence when she sat for her portrait in 1803. Isabella was married to Danish consul Jens Wolff, but she separated from him in 1810. Sir Michael Levey suggests that people may have wondered if Lawrence was the father of her son Herman.

Lawrence's departures from portraiture were very rare. In the early 1790s he completed two history pictures: Homer reciting his poems, a small picture of the poet in a pastoral setting; and Satan summoning his legions, a giant canvas illustrating lines from John Milton's Paradise Lost. Boxer John Jackson posed for the naked body of Satan; the face is that of Sarah Siddons' brother, John Philip Kemble.

Lawrence's parents died within a few months of each other in 1797. He gave up his house in Picadilly, where he had moved from Old Bond Street, to set up his studio in the family home in Greek Street. By now, to keep up with the demand for replicas of his portraits, he was using studio assistants, most notable of whom were William Etty and George Henry Harlow.

The early years of the 19th century saw Lawrence's portrait practice continue to flourish. Amongst his sitters were major political figures such as Henry Dundas, 1st Viscount Melville and William Lamb, 2nd Viscount Melbourne, whose wife Lady Caroline Lamb he also painted. The king commissioned portraits of his daughter-in-law Caroline, the estranged wife of the Prince of Wales; and his granddaughter Charlotte. Lawrence stayed at Montague House, the princess's residence in Blackheath, while he was painting the portraits and thus became implicated in the "delicate investigation" into Caroline's morals. He swore an affidavit that although he had on occasion been alone with her, the door had never been locked or bolted and he had "not the least objection for all the world to have heard or seen what took place". Expertly defended by Spencer Perceval, he was exonerated.

"Pictorial chronicler of the Regency" 

By the time the Prince of Wales was made regent in 1811, Lawrence was acknowledged as the country's foremost portrait painter. Through one of his sitters, Lord Charles Stewart, he met the Prince Regent, who became his most important patron. As well as portraits of himself, the prince commissioned portraits of allied leaders the Duke of Wellington, Field-Marshal von Blücher and Count Platov, who sat for Lawrence at his new house at 65 Russell Square.  (The house was demolished in the early 20th century to make way for the Imperial Hotel.) The private sitting-room of Sir Thomas Lawrence shows Lawrence at 65 Russell Square, surrounded by casts of classical sculpture. The prince also had plans for Lawrence to travel abroad and paint foreign royalty and leaders, and as a preliminary he was given a knighthood on 22 April 1815. Napoleon's return from Elba put these plans on hold, although Lawrence did make a visit to Paris, where his friend Lord Charles Stewart was ambassador, and saw the art that Napoleon had looted from Italy, including Raphael's Transfiguration, the painting he had reproduced for his silver-gilt palette as a boy.

In 1817 the prince commissioned Lawrence to paint a portrait of his daughter Princess Charlotte, who was pregnant with her first child. Charlotte died in childbirth; Lawrence completed the portrait and presented it to her husband Prince Leopold at Claremont on his birthday, as agreed. The princess's obstetrician, Sir Richard Croft, who later shot himself, was the half-brother of Lawrence's friend Elizabeth Croft, and for her Lawrence drew a sketch of Croft in his coffin.

Eventually, in September 1818, Lawrence was able to make his postponed trip to the continent to paint the allied leaders, first at Aachen and then at the conference of Vienna, for what would become the Waterloo Chamber series, housed in Windsor Castle. His sitters included Tsar Alexander, Emperor Francis I of Austria, the King of Prussia, Field-Marshal Prince Schwarzenberg, Archduke Charles of Austria and Henriette his wife, Lady Selina Caroline, wife of the Count of Clam-Martinic and a young Napoleon II, as well as various French and Prussian ministers. In May 1819, still under orders from the Prince Regent, he left Vienna for Rome to paint Pope Pius VII and Cardinal Consalvi.

President of the Royal Academy 

Lawrence arrived back in London 30 March 1820 to find that the president of the Royal Academy, Benjamin West, had died. That very evening Lawrence was voted the new president, a position he would hold until his death 10 years later. George III had died in January; Lawrence was granted a place in the procession for the coronation of George IV. On 28 February 1822 he was elected as a Fellow of the Royal Society "for his eminence in art". The royal commissions continued during the 1820s, including one for a portrait of the king's sister Sophia, and one of Sir Walter Scott (along with Jane Austen, one of Lawrence's favourite authors), as well as one to paint King Charles X of France for the Waterloo series, for which Lawrence made a trip to Paris, taking Herman Wolff with him. Lawrence acquired another important patron in Robert Peel, who commissioned the painter to do portraits of his family as well a portrait of George Canning. Two of Lawrence's most famous portraits of children were painted during the 1820s: that of Emily and Laura Calmady, daughters of Charles Calmady, and that of Master Charles William Lambton, painted for his father Lord Durham for 600 guineas and known as The Red Boy. The latter portrait attracted much praise when it was exhibited in Paris in 1827. One of the artist's last commissions was of future prime-minister the Earl of Aberdeen. Fanny Kemble, a niece of Sarah Siddons, was one of his last sitters (for a drawing).

Lawrence died suddenly on 7 January 1830, just months after his friend Isabella Wolff. A few days previously he had experienced chest pains but had continued working and was eagerly anticipating a stay with his sister at Rugby, when he collapsed and died during a visit from his friends Elizabeth Croft and Archibald Keightley. After a post-mortem examination, doctors concluded that the artist's death had been caused by ossification of the aorta and vessels of the heart. Lawrence's first biographer, D. E. Williams suggested that this in itself was not enough to cause death and it was his doctors' over-zealous bleeding and leeching that killed him. Lawrence was buried on 21 January in the crypt of St Paul's Cathedral. Amongst the mourners was J. M. W. Turner who painted a sketch of the funeral from memory.

Lawrence was famed for the length of time he took to finish some of his paintings (Isabella Wolff waited twelve years for her portrait to be completed) and, at his death, his studio contained a large number of unfinished works. Some were completed by his assistants and other artists, some were sold as they were. In his will Lawrence left instructions to offer, at a price much below their worth, his collection of Old Master drawings to first George IV, then the trustees of the British Museum, then Robert Peel and the Earl of Dudley. None of them accepted the offer and the collection was split up and auctioned; many of the drawings later found their way into the British Museum and the Ashmolean Museum. After Lawrence's creditors had been paid, there was no money left, although a memorial exhibition at the British Institution raised £3,000 which was given to his nieces.

Legacy 
Lawrence's friends asked Scottish poet Thomas Campbell to write the artist's biography, but he passed on the task to D.E. Williams, whose two rather inaccurate volumes were published in 1831. It was nearly 70 years later, in 1900, before another biography of Lawrence appeared by Lord Ronald Gower. In 1913, Sir Walter Armstrong, who was not a great admirer of Lawrence, published a monograph. The 1950s saw the publication of two further works: Douglas Goldring's Regency portrait painter, and Kenneth Garlick's catalogue of Lawrence's paintings (a further edition was published in 1989). Sir Michael Levey, curator of the National Portrait Gallery's 1979–80 Lawrence exhibition, produced books on the artist in 1979 and 2005. Lawrence's entanglements with the Siddons family has been the subject of three books (by Oswald Knapp, André Maurois, and Naomi Royde-Smith) and a recent radio play.

Lawrence's reputation as an artist fell during the Victorian era. Critic and artist Roger Fry did something to restore it in the 1930s, when he described Lawrence as having a "consummate mastery over the means of artistic expression" with an "unerring hand and eye". At one time Lawrence was more popular in the United States and France than in Britain; and some of his best known portraits, including those of Elizabeth Farren, Sarah Barrett Moulton (known to her family as Pinkie) and Charles Lambton (the "Red Boy") found their way to the United States during the early-20th-century enthusiasm there for English portraits. Sir Michael Levey acknowledges that Lawrence is still dismissed by some art historians: "He was a highly original artist, quite unexpected on the English scene: self-taught, self-absorbed in perfecting his own personal style, and in effect self-destructing, since he left behind no significant followers or creative influence. Leaving aside Sargent, his sole successor has been not in painting, but in fashionable, virtuoso photography."

The most extensive collections of Lawrence's work can be found in the Royal Collections and the National Portrait Gallery in London. The Tate Britain, the National Gallery and the Dulwich Picture Gallery house smaller collections of his work in London. There are a few examples of his work in the Holburne Museum of Art and the Victoria Art Gallery in Bath, and in Bristol City Museum and Art Gallery. In the United States, The Huntington Library houses Pinkie, and Lawrence's portraits of Elizabeth Farren, Lady Harriet Maria Conyngham, and the Calmady children are in the Metropolitan Museum of Art. In Europe, the Musée du Louvre has a few examples of Lawrence's work, and the Vatican Pinacoteca has a swagger portrait of George IV (presented by the king himself) as almost its only British work.

In 2010 the National Portrait Gallery held a retrospective exhibition of Lawrence's work. The director of the National Portrait Gallery, Sandy Nairne, was quoted in the Guardian describing Lawrence as "…a huge figure. But a huge figure who we believe deserves a great deal more attention. He is one of the great painters of the last 250 years and one of the great stars of portraiture on a European stage." In December 2018, a portrait of Lady Selina Meade (1797–1872), who married the Count of Clam-Martinic, painted by Lawrence in Vienna in 1819, sold for £2.29 million at auction, a record for the artist.

In literature 
In the 1848 novel, Vanity Fair, William Makepeace Thackeray refers to "...the Lawrence portraits, tawdry and beautiful, and, thirty years ago, deemed as precious as works of real genius..."

A description of Mr Tite Barnacle of the Circumlocution Office as someone who "seemed to have been sitting for his portrait to Sir Thomas Lawrence all the days of his life" is one of 25 references to art in Charles Dickens' 1857 novel Little Dorrit.

In his 1895 play, An Ideal Husband, Oscar Wilde introduces Lord Caversham with a stage direction that describes him as "[r]ather like a portrait by Lawrence".

In the 1943 film The Man in Grey, Lawrence appears in one scene and is played by the actor Stuart Lindsell.

Gallery

See also 
 English school of painting

Notes

References 
 D Goldring, 1951, Regency portrait painter: the life of Sir Thomas Lawrence, P.R.A. London: Macdonald.
 M Levey, 2005, Sir Thomas Lawrence. New Haven and London: Yale University Press.

External links 

 Thomas Lawrence: Regency Power and Brilliance exhibition at the National Portrait Gallery
 Thomas Lawrence exhibition catalogs
 "Gainsborough's forgotten rival is recognised at last" Jerome Taylor, The Independent, 5 August 2010
 "Thomas Lawrence: the new romantic – review" Richard Holmes reviews the National Portrait Gallery exhibition, The Guardian, 16 October 2010
 

1769 births
1830 deaths
18th-century English painters
19th-century English painters
18th-century English male artists
19th-century English male artists
English male painters
Artists from Bristol
English romantic painters
English portrait painters
Fellows of the Royal Society
Principal Painters in Ordinary
Royal Academicians
Knights Bachelor
Burials at St Paul's Cathedral